Portlock (Sugpiaq: Arrulaa'ik) is a ghost town in the U.S. state of Alaska, located on the southern edge of the Kenai Peninsula, around  south of Seldovia. It is located in Port Chatham bay, from which an adjacent community takes its name. Named after Nathaniel Portlock, the town was an active cannery community in the early-twentieth century.

History

Establishment
Portlock was established in the Kenai Peninsula in the early-twentieth century as a cannery, particularly for salmon. It is thought to have been named after Captain Nathaniel Portlock, a British ship captain who sailed there in 1786. In 1921, a United States Post Office opened in the town. The population largely consisted of Russian-Aleuts.

Abandonment
Around the 1940s, it was reported that several Dall sheep hunters had disappeared in the hills outside Portlock; it was also stated in a 1973 article from the Anchorage Daily News that dismembered bodies of some of the missing had washed ashore in the lagoon. These events led the residents of the community to flee en masse, and the town's post office officially closed between 1950 and 1951. Many villagers blamed the unexplained deaths and disappearances on a Bigfoot-like creature referred to locally as Nantinaq.

Post Abandonment 
Most of the people who fled Portlock in the 1940s moved to the nearby Native Alaskan villages of Nanwalek and Port Graham. The village of Nanwalek still maintains private ownership of Portlock today. In recent years, the community has considered the possibility of re-establishing Portlock as a village.

Nearby communities
Portlock was located adjacent to another community known as Port Chatham (which takes its name from Port Chatham bay).

Demographics

Portlock first appeared on the 1940 U.S. Census as an unincorporated village of 31 residents. It would not report again on the census until 1980, when it was made a census-designated place (CDP), again reporting 31 residents. It was dissolved as a CDP by the 1990 census and has not reported again.

In popular culture
In the spring of 2021, Discovery+ filmed a reality television series in Portlock. The series, Alaskan Killer Bigfoot, follows a scout team exploring the ruins of the abandoned village.

Alaskan Killer Bigfoot premiered on Discovery+ on December 7, 2021. It made its linear cable television debut on Travel Channel on June 26, 2022.

References

External links
 
 
Alaska’s Best Known Cryptid Homicide Case Debunked

1950 disestablishments in Alaska
Ghost towns in Alaska
Geography of Kenai Peninsula Borough, Alaska
Bigfoot
Ghost towns in the United States
Ghost towns in North America
Towns in the United States